The Sekwi Formation is a geologic formation in Northwest Territories, Canada, which preserves fossils dating back to the Cambrian period.

The formation principally comprises shallow water carbonates, but deepens to include mid-shelf mudstones, both calcareous and siliciclastic.

It dates from c. 525-510 Ma, the Nevadella / Bonnia-Olenellus trilobite zones.

See also

 List of fossiliferous stratigraphic units in Northwest Territories

References

 

Cambrian Northwest Territories
Cambrian southern paleotropical deposits